Walton Street may refer to:
 Walton Street, Oxford
 Walton Street, London